Marta Prieto (born 11 September 1978) is a Spanish professional golfer from Seville, Spain who plays on the Ladies European Tour.

Amateur career
Prieto was Spanish under-18 champion in 1995 and 1997 Spanish Amateur Champion and played her collegiate golf at Wake Forest University, North Carolina from which she graduated with a degree in economics. In her first year Prieto won the ACC Championship having led from start to finish to earn medalist honors and grabbed a share of the Rookie of the Year honor in addition to being a member of the All-ACC team. She was also named to the All-ACC team in her second year as well as gaining 1999 Golfweek/Sagarin All-Mid-Atlantic/East District second-team all-district honours.

In her junior year she finished 3rd at the NCAA Championships and as a senior was named National Golf Coaches Association (NGCA) 2001 All-America Second team and gained her third All-ACC team honours. Post graduation she won the 2001 British Ladies Amateur Championship and the 2002 Italian Ladies International Championship.

She represented Spain at the 2000 and 2002 Espirito Santo Trophy World Amateur Team Championship.

Professional career
Prieto qualified for the 2003 Ladies European Tour by finishing second at the final Qualifyting tournament. Her best finish in her rookie season was a tie for third at the season ending Biarritz Ladies Classic. In 2004, she had three top ten finishes, the best being a runner's up spot at the KLM Ladies Open. She partnered Paula Martí at the 2006 Women's World Cup of Golf representing Spain.

Team appearances
Amateur
European Ladies' Team Championship (representing Spain): 1997, 1999, 2001
Espirito Santo Trophy (representing Spain): 2000, 2002

Professional
World Cup (representing Spain): 2006

References

Spanish female golfers
Wake Forest Demon Deacons women's golfers
Ladies European Tour golfers
Mediterranean Games gold medalists for Spain
Mediterranean Games silver medalists for Spain
Mediterranean Games medalists in golf
Competitors at the 2001 Mediterranean Games
Sportspeople from Seville
1978 births
Living people
20th-century Spanish women
21st-century Spanish women